The McKeesport Transportation Center is a bus, and formerly train, station located in McKeesport, Pennsylvania.

History 
The station was served by the PATrain commuter rail service between Versailles and Pittsburgh, and its predecessor, the Baltimore and Ohio Railroad operated Pittsburgh - Mckeesport - Versailles commuter service. Amtrak's Capitol Limited began stopping in McKeesport in 1982.

PATrain service was discontinued in April 1989, and replaced by an express bus service from McKeesport. The Capitol Limited ceased to stop in 1991, and in the months prior an average of one passenger boarded at McKeesport per journey.

The McKeesport Transportation Center has remained the primary transit hub of the greater McKeesport area. In response to significant cutbacks to routes in the region by the Port Authority of Allegheny County, Heritage Community Transportation began serving the station in 2014.

In 2017 the complex underwent a $1 million redevelopment, which included demolition of aging structures, new road and parking surfaces, Port Authority driver rest facilities and new shelters.

Services 
The McKeesport Transportation Center is currently served by the Port Authority of Allegheny County and Heritage Community Transportation.

The current Port Authority routes are the 56 Lincoln Place, 6 

61C McKeesport-Homestead and  P7 McKeesport Flyer. A number of additional routes stop kerbside on Lyle Boulevard. The current Heritage route serves a number of adjacent communities.

Facilities 
There is a park and ride lot by the station.

References

External links

 McKeesport Transportation Center Project
 
 
 

Bus stations in Pennsylvania
Former railway stations in Allegheny County, Pennsylvania
McKeesport, Pennsylvania
Railway stations closed in 1991
Former Baltimore and Ohio Railroad stations